José Luis Jiménez Negrón (born June 4, 1954) is a Puerto Rican politician affiliated with the New Progressive Party (PNP). He was a member of the Puerto Rico House of Representatives from 1997 to 2013 representing District 26.

Early years and studies

José Luis Jiménez Negrón was born in Orocovis on June 4, 1954. He graduated from José Rojas Cortés High School in his hometown.

Jiménez received a Bachelor's degree in Business Management from the Interamerican University of Puerto Rico.

Professional career

Before entering politics, Jiménez worked as a manager and supervisor of a farming enterprise. He then worked as Sub-director of the Head Start Program in Orocovis, where he supervised programs, budget, and proposals. After that, he served as Legislative Consultant for the House of Representatives of Puerto Rico.

Political career

Jiménez began his political career in 1996, when he ran for District 26 Representative at the general election that year. He was reelected three times (2000, 2004, 2008). During his last term, he was a member of the Commissions of Treasury, Agriculture, Economic Development, Commerce, Transportation, and others.

In 2012, Jiménez lost his chance for reelection, when he was defeated by Urayoán Hernández at the PNP primaries.

References

External links
José Jiménez Negrón Official biography

Living people
1954 births
Interamerican University of Puerto Rico alumni
New Progressive Party members of the House of Representatives of Puerto Rico
People from Orocovis, Puerto Rico